Valerie Thompson (born April 17, 1967) is an American motorcycle drag and land speed racer. She is a 7-time motorcycle land-speed record holder and charter member of the Mojave Magnum "200 MPH Club."

Thompson raced the BUB Seven Streamliner at the 2017 Bonneville Motorcycle Speed Trials.

References

External links
 
 

1967 births
Living people
American motorcycle racers
Female motorcycle racers
Motorcycle drag racers
Land speed record people
Sportspeople from Tacoma, Washington
Sportspeople from Scottsdale, Arizona
American sportswomen
Bonneville 200 MPH Club members
21st-century American women